The Ford Falcon (XW) is a full-size car that was produced by Ford Australia from 1969 to 1970. It was the third iteration of the second generation of the Falcon and also included the Ford Futura (XW) and the Ford Fairmont (XW)—the luxury-oriented version.

Introduction
The XW Falcon was released in June 1969 replacing the XT Falcon. The XW was an extensive facelift of the XT, featuring a new grille and tail lights. Almost all exterior panels were new and the interior was extensively redesigned.

Model range 
The XW Falcon range featured eight passenger vehicles and three commercial models.

 Ford Falcon Sedan
 Ford Falcon Wagon
 Ford Falcon 500 Sedan
 Ford Falcon 500 Wagon
 Ford Futura Sedan
 Ford Fairmont Sedan
 Ford Fairmont Wagon
 Ford Falcon GT
 Ford Falcon Utility
 Ford Falcon Van
 Ford Falcon 500 Utility

The Futura was new for the XW, reviving a name last used in the 1965 XP Falcon range. A Grand Sport rally option package was available on Falcon 500, Futura & Fairmont sedans.

GT-HO
The limited production, high performance Falcon GT-HO was released two months after the mainstream models. A further development, the GT-HO Phase II was released on 24 August 1970.

Engines
3.1 litre & 3.6 litre in-line six cylinder engines carried over from the XT Falcon as did the 4.9 litre V8. A 5.8 litre V8 (the 351 Windsor) was introduced initially with the XW, as was later the 351 Cleveland in the Phase 1.5 and 2 model.

Production
Production of the XW Falcon range totalled 105,785 vehicles. 2,287 XW Falcon GTs and 662 XW GT-HOs were built.

Replacement
The XW Falcon was replaced by the XY Falcon in October 1970.

References

External links

XW
Cars of Australia
Cars introduced in 1969
Cars discontinued in 1970
XW Falcon
Sedans
Station wagons
Coupé utilities
Vans
Rear-wheel-drive vehicles
1960s cars
1970s cars